Dryptinae is a subfamily of ground beetles in the family Carabidae. There are more than 30 genera and 570 described species in Dryptinae.

Genera
These 33 genera belong to the subfamily Dryptinae:

 Acrogenys W.J.MacLeay, 1864
 Agastus Schmidt-Goebel, 1846
 Ancystroglossus Chaudoir, 1863
 Chaudoirella Mateu, 1982
 Coarazuphium Gnaspini; Vanin & Godoy, 1998
 Colasidia Basilewsky, 1954
 Desera Hope, 1831
 Dicrodontus Chaudoir, 1872
 Drypta Latreille, 1797
 Eunostus Laporte, 1835
 Galerita Fabricius, 1801
 Gunvorita Landin, 1955
 Ildobates Español, 1966
 Leleupidia Basilewsky, 1951
 Megadrypta Sciaky & Anichtchenko, 2020
 Metaxidius Chaudoir, 1852
 Metazuphium Mateu, 1992
 Mischocephalus Chaudoir, 1863
 Neodrypta Basilewsky, 1960
 Neoleleupidia Basilewsky, 1953
 Nesiodrypta Jeannel, 1949
 Paraleleupidia Basilewsky, 1951
 Parazuphium Jeannel, 1942
 Planetes W.S.MacLeay, 1825
 Polistichus Bonelli, 1810
 Prionodrypta Jeannel, 1949
 Pseudaptinus Laporte, 1834
 Speothalpius B.Moore, 1995
 Speozuphium B.Moore, 1995
 Trichognatha Latreille, 1829
 Typhlozuphium Baehr, 2014
 Zuphioides Ball & Shpeley, 2013
 Zuphium Latreille, 1805

References

 
Beetles described in 1810